Per Aarsleff A/S is a Danish civil engineering and construction company.

History
It was founded in 1947 by Per Aarsleff.

Organization 
The company is based in Aabyhøj in the western parts of Aarhus, Denmark. It has around 6,500 staff worldwide.

The Aarsleff Group is the largest producer of concrete piles in Europe. The Danish subsidiary producer of precast concrete piles Centrum Pæle was founded in 1966, and is based in the city of Vejle.

United Kingdom
Per Aarsleff (UK) Ltd, known as Aarsleff Ground Engineering (previously Aarsleff Piling), is based in New Balderton in Newark-on-Trent. The UK site also contains Centrum Pile Ltd, and mainly makes concrete piles. The UK subsidiary was founded in 1991 and is the leading supplier of precast concrete piles in the UK.

Products
The company has been asked to provide the concrete deep foundations for civil engineering projects, such as for bridges or wind farms. For windfarms, it has worked with Bilfinger Construction GmbH of Germany (now owned since 2014 by Implenia of Switzerland). Denmark is home to some important wind turbine manufacturing companies.

It provides:
 Steel sheet piles
 Precast concrete piles
 Bearing piles
 Timber piles

Projects
 Fehmarn Belt Fixed Link, Denmark
 High Speed 1
 Mersey Gateway Bridge in the UK (opening 2017)
 Thames Tideway Scheme, London

See also
 Bachy Solétance
 British Geotechnical Association
 COWI A/S, tunnelling company of Denmark
 Federation of Piling Specialists

References

External links
 Aarsleff DK
 Aarsleff UK

Danish companies established in 1947
Companies based in Aarhus
Construction and civil engineering companies of Denmark
Geotechnical engineering companies
Newark-on-Trent
Construction and civil engineering companies established in 1947